Massachusetts Question 2 may refer to:

1980 Massachusetts Proposition 2½, 1980 ballot
2002 Massachusetts Question 2, the Massachusetts English Language Education in Public Schools Initiative
Question 2, 2006 ballot
2008 Massachusetts Question 2, the Massachusetts Sensible Marijuana Policy Initiative
2010 Massachusetts Question 2, the Massachusetts Comprehensive Permits and Regional Planning Initiative
2012 Massachusetts Question 2, the Massachusetts Death with Dignity Initiative
2014 Massachusetts Question 2, the Massachusetts Expansion of Bottle Deposits Initiative
2016 Massachusetts Question 2, the Massachusetts Charter School Expansion Initiative
Advisory Commission for Amendments to the U.S. Constitution, 2018 ballot
2020 Massachusetts Question 2, the Massachusetts Ranked-Choice Voting Initiative

Politics of Massachusetts